Paul Gabriel Antoine (10 January 1678 – 22 January 1743) was a French Jesuit theologian.

Biography 
Paul Gabriel Antoine was born at Lunéville. At the age of fifteen he applied for admission into the Society of Jesus, and was received 9 October 1693. On the completion of his studies, he taught humanities for several years, first in Pont-à-Mousson, and then in Colmar. Returning to the former town, he occupied the chair of philosophy, and later that of theology, the first edition of his Dogmatic Theology appearing in 1723, and three years later his Moral Theology in three volumes. Afterwards he was rector of the College of Pont-à-Mousson, where he died in his sixty-fifth year.

Works 
His Theologia universa, speculativa et dogmatica, embracing the whole field of scholastic inquiry, met with an enthusiastic reception, and at once stamped the author as one of the leading Catholic theologians of the age. It went through nine editions during his lifetime, and ten after his death. Still more flattering was the reception accorded his Theologia moralis universa, first published in Nancy in 1726, in duodecimo. It has since gone through sixty editions in different countries. The Roman edition of 1747, published by Filippo da Carbognano, O.M., contained several additions to the original, among them chapters on Condemned Propositions, Reserved Cases, decrees of Benedict XIV, etc. Antoine's Moral Theology was so highly esteemed by Benedict XIV that he prescribed its use by the students of the College of Propaganda, and it was likewise received by many of the bishops throughout France and Italy. In the opinion of Jean-Pierre Gury and St. Alphonsus Liguori, Antoine inclines too much toward the side of severity. Besides his theological works, Antoine published also several ascetical and devotional treatises.

References

Attribution
 cites
Sommervogel, Bibliothèque de la Compagnie de Jésus, s. v.

1678 births
1743 deaths
18th-century French Catholic theologians
18th-century French Jesuits
People from Lunéville